
Qiang may refer to:

Culture 
Qiang (name), a Chinese name, including a list of people with the name, or an alternate transliteration of Chinese surname Jiang (surname) (彊/强)
Qiang people, an ethnic group in China
Qiang (historical people) various non-Chinese groups referred to in Chinese historical literature
Qiangic languages, a subfamily of the Tibeto-Burman family spoken in Sichuan and Tibet Autonomous Region

Geography 
 Qiang la, an Indian transliteration of Changla

Military 
Qiang (spear), a type of Chinese spear

See also 
 Qian (disambiguation)
 Jiang (disambiguation)
 Chiang (disambiguation)

Language and nationality disambiguation pages